The 2015–16 season is Dominion Bilbao Basket's 16th in existence and the club's 12th consecutive season in the top flight of Spanish basketball. Bilbao is involved in three competitions.

Players

Squad information

Players in

|}

Total spending:  €0

Players out

|}

Total income:  €20,000

Total expenditure:  €20,000

Club

Technical staff

Kit
Supplier: Erreà / Sponsor: Dominion

Pre-season and friendlies

Competitions

Overall

Overview
{| class="wikitable" style="text-align:center"
|-
! rowspan="2" | Competition
! colspan="8" | Record
|-
! 
! 
! 
! 
! 
! 
! 
! 
|-
| Liga ACB

|- style="background:#EEEEEE"
| Copa del Rey

|-
| Eurocup

|-
! Total

Liga ACB

League table

Results summary

Results by round

Matches

Results overview

Eurocup

Regular season

Last 32

Copa del Rey

Statistics

Liga ACB

Copa del Rey

Eurocup

References

External links
 Official website
 Bilbao Basket at ACB.com 
 Bilbao Basket at the Eurocup

Bilbao Basket
 
Bil